

From 1980 to 1989, the Edmonton Eskimos won four Grey Cups. During the decade, the Eskimos compiled a record of 127 wins, 56 losses, and 2 ties. One of the highlights of the decade was the emergence of Matt Dunigan. From 1984–87, the Esks record improved with Dunigan at the helm. Avenging a loss to the Hamilton Tiger-Cats in the 1986 Grey Cup, the Eskimos once again reigned supreme and captured the Cup in 1987.

1980

1981

1982

1983

The Eskimos offense had 472 points for, while the defense had 426 points allowed. Warren Moon finished his career in the CFL in 1983. He was the league's leading passer with 380 completions of 664 attempts for 5,648 yards and 31 touchdowns. He was also named to the West All-Star team, the CFL All-Star team and won the Schenley Most Outstanding Player Award.

Schedule

Postseason

Player stats

Passing

Rushing

Awards and honors
CFL's Most Outstanding Player Award – Warren Moon
Jeff Nicklin Memorial Trophy – Warren Moon

1984

The Eskimos offense had 484 points for, while the defense had 498 points allowed. In 1984, Matt Dunigan captured the Molson Toughest Yard Award given to the player that exemplified heart, desire, determination, toughness, and the will to win by going the extra yard.

Schedule

Postseason

Player stats

Passing

Awards and honors
Molson Toughest Yard Award: Matt Dunigan
Norm Fieldgate Trophy: James "Quick" Parker

1985

The Eskimos offense had 447 points for, while the defense had 395 points allowed

Schedule

Postseason

Player stats

Passing

Awards and honors

1986

The Eskimos offense had 623 points for, while the defense had 427 points allowed

Schedule

Postseason

Player stats

Passing

Punt Returns

Kickoff Returns

Awards and honors
Dave Dryburgh Memorial Trophy – Tom Dixon

1987

1988

1989

References

External links
Official site

Edmonton Elks seasons